Safaa Abdallah Mohammed El Tokhi (born 22 August 1964), popularly known as Safaa El-Toukhi, is an Egyptian actress. She is best known for the roles in the films The Hunter, Gunshot and Kafr Delhab.

Personal life
She was born on 22 August 1964 in Cairo, Egypt. Her father Abdallah Al-Toukhi was a radical playwright who was born on 18 August 1926 and died on 26 February 2001 at the age of 74. Her mother Fathia al-Assal was a prominent Egyptian playwright and activist. Fathia was born on 20 February 1933 and died on 15 June 2014 at the age of 81 following an unspecified health crisis.

Career
She graduated with a bachelor's degree at Higher Institute of Dramatic Arts in 1985. At the beginning, she worked as a writer, influenced by her mother. In 1995, he started to work at the Institute of National Culture.

Safaa began her acting career in 1979 with the television serial El Bahitha. She appeared as a stage actress only in one play El Ayyam El Makhmoura staged in 1999. Then she continued to act in several films, such as El Zaman El Saa’b, El Mohagir, and Bekhit we Adila. In the meantime, she dominated the television screen, where she starred in the serials: Leyali El Hulmiyya, Lan Ayesh Fi Galbab Abi, Mahmoud El Masry. Her most notable television performance came through the serial Qadhiya Rai’ ‘Am with the role 'Yousra'.

Filmography

References

External links
 

Living people
1964 births
Egyptian film actresses
Egyptian television actresses
Egyptian film people